Anna Maria "Ans" Dekker (born 1 March 1955) is a former artistic gymnast from the Netherlands who competed at the 1972 and 1976 Summer Olympics in all artistic gymnastics events. Her best achievement was 9th place in the team all-around in 1972.

She is wife of Sjaak Pieters, aunt of Amy Pieters and sister-in-law of Peter Pieters, all of whom are Olympic cyclists.

References

1955 births
Living people
Gymnasts at the 1972 Summer Olympics
Gymnasts at the 1976 Summer Olympics
Dutch female artistic gymnasts
Olympic gymnasts of the Netherlands
Sportspeople from Beverwijk